Camel Rock may refer to:

Camel Rock in the Chiricahua National Monument, Arizona
Camel Rock formation at Tesuque Pueblo, New Mexico
Camel Rocks (Kamelfelsen), a rock formation on the Königstein hill in Germany